Bézac is a commune in the Ariège department of southwestern France. On 1 January 2023, the former commune of Saint-Amans was merged into Bézac.

Population

See also
Communes of the Ariège department

References

Communes of Ariège (department)
Communes nouvelles of Ariège
Ariège communes articles needing translation from French Wikipedia